1010 is the year AD 1010.

1010 may also refer to
 October 10
 10:10, a climate change campaign
10:10 (film), 2008
 "10/10", a song by Scottish singer-songwriter Paolo Nutini
 "10/10" (Maître Gims song)
"10/10", a song by Troye Sivan from his 2020 EP In a Dream
10/10, a 2020 album by Ledri Vula

See also
Ten10 (disambiguation)
10x10 (disambiguation)